These are the full results of the 2002 NACAC Under-25 Championships in Athletics which took place between August 9 and August 11, 2002, at E.M. Stevens Stadium in San Antonio, Texas, United States.

Men's results

100 meters

Final
Wind: +0.3 m/s

Heat 1
Wind: +1.2 m/s

Heat 2
Wind: +0.9 m/s

Heat 3
Wind: +0.9 m/s

200 meters

Final
Wind: +0.5 m/s

Heat 1
Wind: +1.6 m/s

Heat 2
Wind: +1.2 m/s

Heat 3
Wind: +0.9 m/s

400 meters

Final

Heat 1

Heat 2

Heat 3

800 meters

Final

Heat 1

Heat 2

1500 meters
Final

5000 meters
Final

10,000 meters
Final

Half marathon
Final

3000 meters steeplechase
Final

110 meters hurdles
Final
Wind: +1.3 m/s

400 meters hurdles

Final

Heat 1

Heat 2

High jump
Final

Pole vault
Final

Long jump
Final

Triple jump
Final

Shot put
Final

Discus throw
Final

Hammer throw
Final

Javelin throw
Final

Decathlon
Final

20,000 meters walk
Final

4x100 meters relay
Final

4x400 meters relay
Final

Women's results

100 meters
Final
Wind: +0.3 m/s

200 meters

Final
Wind: -0.3 m/s

†: Crystal Cox ranked initially 1st (23.02s), but was disqualified later for infringement of IAAF doping rules.

Heat 1
Wind: +0.0 m/s

†: Crystal Cox initially reached the final (23.17s), but was disqualified later for infringement of IAAF doping rules.

Heat 2
Wind: -0.3 m/s

400 meters

Final

†: Crystal Cox ranked initially 2nd (51.63s), but was disqualified later for infringement of IAAF doping rules.

Heat 1

†: Crystal Cox initially reached the final (52.24s), but was disqualified later for infringement of IAAF doping rules.

Heat 2

800 meters
Final

1500 meters
Final

5000 meters
Final

Half marathon
Final

3000 meters steeplechase
Final

100 meters hurdles
Final
Wind: +1.7 m/s

400 meters hurdles
Final

High jump
Final

Pole vault
Final

Long jump
Final

Triple jump
Final

Shot put
Final

Discus throw
Final

Hammer throw
Final

Javelin throw
Final

Heptathlon
Final

20,000 meters walk
Final

4x100 meters relay
Final

4x400 meters relay
Final

†: The event was initially won by the United States (3:30.60 min), but the team was later disqualified for infringement of IAAF doping rules by team member Crystal Cox.

References

Events at the NACAC Under-23 Championships in Athletics
NACAC Under-25 Championships in Athletics
NACAC Under-25 Championships in Athletics
International track and field competitions hosted by the United States
NACAC Under-25 Championships in Athletics